Polansia tenuifolia is a species of flowering plant in the family Cleomaceae. It grows in Florida. It is known by the common names pineland catchfly and slender-leaf clammyweed (or slenderleaf clammyweed). It is synonymous with Aldenella tenuifolia, Cleome aldanella, Cleome tenuifolia, and Jacksonia tenuifolia. It is an annual.

References

Cleomaceae